Hihifo (Uvean for "West") is one of the 5 districts of Wallis and Futuna, located in Wallis Island, in the Pacific Ocean. It is part of the Chiefdom of ʻUvea.

Geography
Located in the northern side of the island, Hihifo borders with the districts of Hahake. Vaitupu is the administrative seat.

The district is divided into 5 municipal villages:

Climate
Hihifo has a tropical rainforest climate (Köppen climate classification Af).

See also
Hihifo Airport

References

External links

Chiefdoms and districts of Wallis and Futuna